Jayashree, known by her screen name Sudha Rani, is an Indian actress, voice artist and a former model. She has primarily worked in Kannada films.she also acted in a few  Telugu, Tulu and Malayalam films.

At the age of three, Rani was chosen as a child model for a commercial biscuit brand. As a child artist, she acted in Kiladi Kittu (1978), Kulla Kulli (1980), Anupama (1981) Bhagyavantha and Ranganayaki (1981). She debuted as a lead actress at age 13 with Anand (1986). During the late 1980s and throughout 1990s, she was part of several commercial successes such as Ranaranga (1988), Krishna Nee Kunidaga (1989), Panchama Veda (1989), Mysooru Mallige (1992), Mannina Doni (1992), Mane Devru (1993), Anuraga Sangama (1995) Swathi, Midida Shruti, Aragini, Shreegandha, Kunkuma Bhagya, Kavya, Saptapadi, Munjaneya Manju, Manamecchida hudugi, and Sparsha (2000) among others. She has so far won the Filmfare Awards and Karnataka State Film Awards twice each for her performances.

Early years
Sudha Rani was born to Gopalakrishna and Nagalakshmi. She is the niece of popular film personality, Chi. Udaya Shankar and the cousin of actor-director Chi. Guru Dutt. She began modelling in print ads at the age of three. Her mother enrolled her in dance classes at age five. Rani is a Kuchipudi and Bharata Natyam dancer. At age 7, she was roped in by her brother for his short film based on children, titled as Child is Here which won an international award. She also actively participated in the children shows at the Prabhat Kalavidaru theatre troupe.

Film career
Sudha Rani was noticed by producer Parvathamma Rajkumar in a thread ceremony video when she was 12 and selected to be the heroine for the film Anand (1986) opposite Shiva Rajkumar. They became a popular pair and she went on to appear in more films as Mana Mechchida Hudugi, Samara, Aasegobba Meesegobba and Midida Shruthi opposite Shiva Rajkumar. She was paired with Ramesh Aravind in over eight films, including Panchama Veda, Shrigandha, Aragini, Ganda Mane Makkalu, Varagala Bete, Balondu Chaduranga, Accident and Anuraga Sangama. Her Tamil films Annakili Sonna Kathai and Vasanthakala Paravai, proved to be commercial successes. She acted in almost 10 Tamil films and was credited as Shali.

Personal life
Sudha Rani married a U.S.-based anesthesia specialist, Dr. Sanjay in 1996. However citing irreconcilable differences, they parted ways in 1998. Later, she married Govardhan in 2000 and has a daughter Nidhi, born in 2001.

Awards

Filmography 

All films are in Kannada, unless otherwise noted.

Voice over

References

External links

Actresses in Kannada cinema
Living people
Kannada people
Actresses from Bangalore
Indian film actresses
Filmfare Awards winners
Filmfare Awards South winners
Actresses in Malayalam cinema
Actresses in Tamil cinema
Child actresses in Kannada cinema
20th-century Indian actresses
21st-century Indian actresses
Indian voice actresses
Actresses in Telugu cinema
Actresses in Tulu cinema
Year of birth missing (living people)